Live from the BBC is a British stand-up comedy series that has aired on the online BBC Three service since 17 February 2016. Three series have aired, both with six episodes. Series one has two comedians per episode (three in episode 5) and series two and three have one comedian per episode. The series is filmed at the BBC Radio Theatre at the Broadcasting House in London.

Episodes

Series 1 (2016)
<onlyinclude>{| class="wikitable" style="text-align:center; width:50%;"
|-
! Episode
! Comedians
! Airdate
|-
| 1
| Mae MartinNish Kumar
| 17 February 2016
|-
| 2
| Alex EdelmanTez Ilyas
| 24 February 2016
|-
| 3
| Spencer JonesJames Acaster
| 2 March 2016
|-
| 4
| Larry DeanFelicity Ward
| 9 March 2016
|-
| 5 
| Kerry & KurtanSofie Hagen
| 16 March 2016
|-
| 6
| Adam HessDane Baptiste
| 23 March 2016
|}

Series 2 (2017)
<onlyinclude>{| class="wikitable" style="text-align:center; width:50%;"
|-
! Episode
! Comedian
! Airdate
|-
| 1
| Sara PascoeJonny Pelham (in extended version)
| 15 June 2017
|-
| 2
| Doc BrownLou Sanders (in extended version)
| 22 June 2017
|-
| 3
| John RobinsTom Ward (in extended version)
| 29 June 2017
|-
| 4
| Josie LongGuz Khan (in extended version)
| 29 June 2017
|-
| 5
| Ivo GrahamLuisa Omielan (in extended version)
| 6 July 2017
|-
| 6
| Liam WilliamsSindhu Vee (in extended version)
| 13 July 2017
|}

Series 3 (2018)
<onlyinclude>{| class="wikitable" style="text-align:center; width:50%;"
|-
! Episode
! Comedian
! Airdate
|-
| 1
| Fern Brady
| 27 June 2018
|-
| 2
| Rhys Nicholson
| 4 July 2018
|-
| 3
| Suzi Ruffell
| 11 July 2018
|-
| 4
| Chris Washington
| 18 July 2018
|-
| 5
| Desiree Burch
| 25 July 2018
|-
| 6
| Mat Ewins
| 1 August 2018
|}

References

External links

2016 British television series debuts
2010s British comedy television series
BBC high definition shows
BBC television comedy
British stand-up comedy television series
English-language television shows